is the seventh studio album by Japanese singer-songwriter Yosui Inoue, released in September 1979.

Track listing
All songs written and composed by Yōsui Inoue, except where indicated

Side one
All songs arranged by Masayoshi Takanaka (except "Jiken" and "Kon'ya" arranged by Katz Hoshi)
"" (Inoue/Masayoshi Takanaka)
"Mellow Touch"
"" (Inoue/Hitoshi Komuro)
""
""

Side two
All songs arranged by Katz Hoshi (except "Nazeka Shanghai" and "Musume ga Nejireru Toki" arranged by Masayoshi Takanaka)
""
""
""
"" (Inoue/Katz Hoshi)
""

Personnel

Yōsui Inoue - Vocals, acoustic guitar
Masayoshi Takanaka - Electric guitar, acoustic guitar, solina
Tsuyoshi Kon - Electric guitar
Kazuo Shiina - Electric guitar
Getao Takahashi - Electric bass, percussion
Akihiro Tanaka - Electric bass
Hiroki Inui - Acoustic piano, Hammond organ, synthesizer
Kiyozumi Ishikawa - Acoustic piano
Yasuharu Nakanishi - Electric piano, acoustic piano
Yūji Yoshikawa - Percussion
Osamu Nakajima - Percussion
Yuki Sugawara - Percussion, timpales
Majority Clapping Association - Hand-clapping
Yutaka Uehara - Drums
Shigeru Inoue - Drums, synth drums
Jake H. Conception - Saxophone
Hidefumi Toki - Saxophone
Shin Kazuhara - Flugel horn
Mitsuru Aim - Flute
Masaharu Ishibashi - Flute
Yukio Etou - Flute
Katou Takashi Group - Strings
Ōno Tadaaki Group - Strings
Kayoko Ishū - Chorus
Kayoko Wada - Chorus
Hiroko Suzuki - Chorus
Minako Yoshida - Chorus

Chart positions

Album

Single

References

1979 albums
Yōsui Inoue albums